Matt Hatchadorian is a former member of the Ohio House of Representatives. He was a Republican candidate for Congress in 1984, losing to Rep. Ed Feighan.

References

External links
Matt Hatchadorian- Esq
Hatchadorian in 1984
Voter Profile

Republican Party members of the Ohio House of Representatives
Living people
1941 births